Richland Springs Independent School District is a public school district based in Richland Springs, Texas (USA).

The district has one school, Richland Springs School that serves students in grades kindergarten through twelve.

Academic achievement
In 2009, the school district was rated "academically acceptable" by the Texas Education Agency.

Special programs

Athletics
Richland Springs won the 2004, 2006, 2007, 2010, 2011, 2012, 2015, & 2016 state six-man football championships. In 2009, the Coyotes moved from Division I for bigger six-man schools to Division II for smaller six-man schools. The 2007 team was nominated by Dave Campbell's Texas Football in its 50th anniversary special as the #45 most memorable team (pro, college, or high school) in Texas History.

See also

List of school districts in Texas 
List of high schools in Texas

References

External links
Richland Springs ISD

School districts in San Saba County, Texas